SS Green Mountain State (T-ACS-9) is a crane ship in ready reserve for the United States Navy.  The ship was named for the state of Vermont, which is also known as the Green Mountain State.

History 
Green Mountain State was laid down on 2 December 1963 as the break-bulk freighter SS Mormacaltair, ON 298129, IMO 6421347, a Maritime Administration type (C4-S-60a) hull, under MARAD contract (MA 143). Built by Ingalls Shipbuilding at Pascagoula, Mississippi (hull no. 486), she was launched on 20 August 1964 and delivered to MARAD 26 March 1965, for service with Moore-McCormack Lines, Inc.  In 1975 the ship was lengthened and converted to a partial container ship by Todd Ship Yard, Galveston, Texas. She was sold to United States Lines in 1983 and renamed SS American Altair. US Lines ceased operations in 1986 and the ship was turned over to MARAD in 1987 and placed in the National Defense Reserve Fleet (NDRF). The ship was converted to a MARAD hull type (C6-S-MA60d) Crane Ship at National Steel and Shipbuilding Co., San Diego, California, and placed in service as SS Green Mountain State (T-ACS-9) on 15 March 1992, assigned to the Ready Reserve Force (RRF), under operation control of Military Sealift Command (MSC).

Green Mountain State was berthed at Bremerton, Washington, where she was maintained in a five-day readiness status, assigned to Maritime Prepositioning Ship Squadron Three.  She was removed from MSC control and withdrawn from the RRF by reassignment to the National Defense Reserve Fleet (Beaumont, Texas) on 28 July 2006.  She has since been reassigned to the Suisun Bay Reserve Fleet.

References

Notes

Bibliography

Online 
 SS Green Mountain State (T-ACS-9)

External links 
 National Defense Reserve Fleet Inventory

 

Ships built in Pascagoula, Mississippi
1964 ships
Keystone State-class crane ships